Ulldemolins is a municipality in the comarca of the Priorat in Catalonia, Spain.

This town is located among rocky mountains, the Serra de la Llena, the Serra de Montsant and the Prades Mountains.

History
In medieval times the town was part of the Barony of Entença.

References

External links 
Official website
 Government data pages 

Municipalities in Priorat
Populated places in Priorat